Anne Philomena O'Brien (born 1954) is an Australian historian and author who is a professor at the University of New South Wales.

Early life
Anne Philomena O'Brien was born in 1954 in Glenelg, South Australia, Australia. Her parents were Paul and Mary (Mollie) O'Brien. Anne was their fifth and youngest daughter.

Education 
In 1975, O'Brien earned a Bachelor of Arts in history from the University of Adelaide, graduating with honours. She taught part-time for a year at Flinders University in South Australia, before enrolling in a PhD program at the University of Sydney. She completed her PhD in 1982.

Career 
From 1982 to 1985, she taught at Santa Sabina College.

In 1987, O'Brien began lecturing in history at the University of New South Wales. She became an associate professor in 2007, and later became a full professor in the School of Humanities and Languages.

In 1988, O'Brien published her first book, Poverty's Prison. The Poor in New South Wales 1880–1918, which was based on her PhD research. Her second book, God's Willing Workers: Women and Religion in Australia, was published in 2005. She published Philanthropy and Settler Colonialism in 2014.

O'Brien is married and has two children.

References 

Living people
1954 births
20th-century Australian women
21st-century Australian women
21st-century Australian people
Australian historians
University of Sydney alumni
Academic staff of the University of New South Wales